Linggi is a mukim and town in Port Dickson District, Negeri Sembilan, Malaysia.

References

Mukims of Negeri Sembilan
Port Dickson District